Sylvie Paycha (born 27 March 1960 in Neuilly-sur-Seine) is a French mathematician and mathematical physicist working in operator theory as a professor at the University of Potsdam.
She has chaired both European Women in Mathematics and L'association femmes et mathématiques.

Education
She completed her PhD thesis at the University of Bochum, Germany in 1988.
Her doctoral advisor was Sergio Albeverio.

Selected publications

References

External links
 

French mathematicians
Women mathematicians
Living people
1960 births
Academic staff of the University of Potsdam